Parashiela is a genus of minute sea snails, marine gastropod mollusks or micromollusks in the family Rissoidae.

Species
Species within the genus Ovirissoa include:
 Parashiela ambulata Laseron, 1956

Distribution
This species is found along Japan and Australia.

References

 Ponder W. F. (1985). A review of the Genera of the Rissoidae (Mollusca: Mesogastropoda: Rissoacea). Records of the Australian Museum supplement 4: 1-221 page(s): 50-51

Rissoidae
Monotypic gastropod genera